Babasaheb Bhimrao Ambedkar University (BBAU) is a Central University in Lucknow, Uttar Pradesh. The university is named after Babasaheb Ambedkar, social reformer, polymath and the architect of the Indian Constitution. The university was established on 10 January 1996. The university has a satellite campus at Amethi too, which was established in 2016.

Campus

The campus is spread in the city of Lucknow at Vidya Vihar, Raebareli Road, Lucknow – 226025 (Uttar Pradesh). The main campus is at Lucknow and spread over 250 acres which is eco-friendly environment for focused study. A satellite campus of the university is at Amethi and it runs mostly UG courses. The satellite campus was established in 2016.

Schools 
 School of Engineering Technology (UIET)
 School of Information Science Technology 
 School of Ambedkar Studies for Social Sciences 
 School of Life Sciences
 School of Environmental Science 
 School of Education 
 School of Home Sciences 
 School of Legal Studies
 School of Management Studies
 School of Physical & Decision Sciences
 School of Languages and Literature
 School of Media and Communication
 School of Economics and Commerce
 School of Agriculture Sciences & Technology
 School of Biomedical & Pharmaceutical Sciences

Gautam Buddha central library 

The central library was established in January 1998 to promote knowledge and application through its effective dissemination of knowledge and information. The central library of BBAU was named Gautam Buddha central library after Gautam Buddha. The Library is governed by LAC (Library Advisory Committee).

Ranking 

The National Institutional Ranking Framework (NIRF) ranked it sixty five Universities in 2021 .It also ranked it 76–100 in the management ranking.

Facilities

DST-Centre for Policy Research:

The Department of Science and Technology, Govt. of India has granted Babasaheb Bhimrao Ambedkar University, Lucknow a special project to establish the ‘Centre for Policy Research’ with a particular focus on inclusive growth using science, technology and innovation.

 NCC: 
The NCC is the largest uniformed youth organization. Its motto is 'Unity and Discipline'.

YOUTUBE VIDEO LECTURE: 
This  university also provided YouTube video lecture of their courses.

The university commemorates its Foundation Day on 10 January every year. Lectures by academics on current and general issues followed by Cultural Programme by the university students are the basic features of the celebration. On this occasion, a convocation is always organized.

Notable people
 

 Ranbir Chander Sobti
 R. G. Sonkawade

References

External links
 Babasaheb Bhimrao Ambedkar University
 
 
 
 

Universities and colleges in Lucknow
Central universities in Uttar Pradesh
Educational institutions established in 1996
1996 establishments in Uttar Pradesh
Pharmacy colleges in Uttar Pradesh